The 25th Rhythmic Gymnastics European Championships was opened on May 15, 2009 in Baku, Azerbaijan in the Heydar Aliyev Sports-Concert Complex and ended on May 17. 186 gymnasts from 32 countries were scheduled to participate.

Gazelle has chosen to be the official symbol of this tournament. The Head of the European Union of Gymnastics Dimitrios Dimitropulos said an official opening ceremony that "the championship has been organized in line with high standards".

Medal winners

Senior Results

Team

Rope

Hoop

Ball

Ribbon

Junior Results

Group 5 ribbons

References

External links
Official site (English version)

Rhythmic Gymnastics European Championships
Rhythmic
International gymnastics competitions hosted by Azerbaijan
Rhythmic Gymnastics European Championships, 2009
Sports competitions in Baku